Coelogyne lawrenceana is a species of orchid. It is endemic to Vietnam.

References 

lawrenceana
Orchids of Vietnam
Endemic flora of Vietnam
Plants described in 1905
Taxa named by Robert Allen Rolfe